The 1969 Atlantic hurricane season was the most active Atlantic hurricane season since the 1933 season, and was the final year of the most recent positive ("high-quality") Atlantic multidecadal oscillation (AMO) era. The hurricane season officially began on June 1, and lasted until November 30. The season had the highest number of systems reach hurricane status – twelve – in a single season, until that record was surpassed in 2005. The season was above-average despite an El Niño, which typically suppresses activity in the Atlantic Ocean, while increasing tropical cyclone activity in the Pacific Ocean. Activity began with a tropical depression that caused extensive flooding in Cuba and Jamaica in early June. On July 25, Tropical Storm Anna developed, the first named storm of the season. Later in the season, Tropical Depression Twenty-Nine caused severe local flooding in the Florida Panhandle and southwestern Georgia in September.

The most significant storm of the season was Hurricane Camille, which peaked as a Category 5 hurricane on August 17 and devastated the Gulf Coast of the United States upon striking Mississippi the next day. Strong winds and storm surge heights especially impacted Mississippi and Louisiana. Later in its duration, the storm caused severe flooding Virginia and West Virginia. Camille alone was responsible for 259 deaths and $1.43 billion. It was the costliest United States hurricane at the time, until Hurricane Agnes in 1972. In early September, Hurricane Francelia caused deadly floods in Central America, with 271 people killed in Central America. Hurricane Inga had the third longest duration of an Atlantic tropical cyclone. The last storm, Hurricane Martha, was the only known tropical cyclone to make landfall in Panama. Martha caused minor flooding in the former and Costa Rica. Overall, the systems of the season collectively caused 535 deaths and over $1.5 billion in losses.

Season summary 

The 1969 Atlantic hurricane season officially began on June 1. Of the twenty-four tropical cyclones that developed in the North Atlantic Ocean in 1969, eighteen of them intensified into tropical storms; this was above the 1950–2000 average of 9.6 named storms. In terms of tropical storms, it was the busiest season since 1933. Twelve of the eighteen named storms reached hurricane status, a record that stood until there were fifteen named storms in 2005. Three of the hurricanes deepened into major hurricanes, which are Category 3 or higher on the Saffir–Simpson hurricane wind scale. Between 1950 and 2000, there was an average of 2.3 major hurricanes per season. Throughout the season, the U.S. Weather Bureau issued more advisories than in any previous season. Additionally, reconnaissance aircraft were utilized for more flight hours than in any year in the Atlantic basin until that point. The season officially ended on November 30.

Hurricane Camille made landfall in Mississippi on August 18 as a Category 5 hurricane, becoming one of only four tropical cyclones to strike the United States as a Category 5, the others being the Labor Day hurricane in 1935, Hurricane Andrew in 1992, and Hurricane Michael in 2018. Project Stormfury conducted seeding experiments on Hurricane Debbie, which declined in wind speed by 31% on the first day and by 18% of the following day. With a duration of almost 25 days from September 20 to October 15, Hurricane Inga is the third longest-lasting tropical cyclone in the Atlantic, behind only the San Ciriaco hurricane of 1899 and Hurricane Ginger in 1971. On November 24, Hurricane Martha became the first tropical cyclone on record to strike Panama.

The season was above average despite an El Niño, which typically suppresses tropical cyclogenesis in the Atlantic Ocean while increasing activity in the eastern Pacific Ocean. The Atlantic upper tropospheric shear line, a semi-permanent feature that extended southeastward into the Caribbean Sea, which enhances outflow from disturbances, remained persistent throughout the season. However, the opposite periphery of the shear line inhibits the divergent outflow of a disturbance. This may have increased the number of tropical cyclones developing, while causing other storms to remain weak or dissipate over the deep tropics. Additionally, an abnormally strong mid-tropospheric ridge replaced the southward-displaced westerlies that deterred tropical cyclone formation in 1968. Five hurricanes and two tropical storms made landfall, causing 535 deaths and $1.5 billion in damage; Tropical Depression Twenty-Nine also resulted in damage.

Tropical cyclogenesis began early, with a tropical depression that affected Jamaica. Activity briefly went dormant between June 15 and July 25, when the next depression originated. That same day, the season's first named storm, Anna, developed over the eastern Atlantic. There were five tropical cyclones that formed in the month of August – Blanche, Camille, Debbie, Eve, and Francelia.

September was the most active month of the season, with six tropical cyclones, five of which intensified into a tropical storm – Gerda, Holly, Inga, and an unnamed hurricane. Of the five named storms that originated in October, three intensified into hurricanes, including Kara, Laurie, and an unnamed storm. This was well above the currently used 1981–2010 average of two tropical storms and one hurricane in the month of October. Although an unnamed hurricane existed into November, Martha was the only tropical cyclone to originate in that month. Martha, the last storm of the season, dissipated over Panama on November 25.

The season's activity was reflected with an accumulated cyclone energy (ACE) rating of 166. ACE is, broadly speaking, a measure of the power of the hurricane multiplied by the length of time it existed, so storms that last a long time, as well as particularly strong hurricanes, have high ACEs. It is only calculated for full advisories on tropical systems at or exceeding , which is the threshold for tropical storm status.

Systems

June tropical depression 

A tropical depression developed near the Yucatan Peninsula on June 7. It moved north, reaching western Cuba by the following day. As the depression moved towards Florida, small-craft warnings were issued for the southern coast. The depression made landfall in Florida on June 9 and dissipated shortly thereafter. As a result of  rain in Cuba, Radio Havana warned of a flash flood and later reported that three rivers were overflowing in Camagüey. Flooding also forced 1,801 people from their homes. Impact from the depression in Florida is unknown.

Damage was catastrophic in Jamaica with landslides, flooding, broken communication lines, cancellation of its railway service and evacuation of hundreds of people from their homes. The Jamaica Railway Corporation's trains were disrupted by landslides blocking the tracks from Spanish Town to Port Antonio and floodwaters inundating a bridge in Gregory Park. A train bound for Kingston was disrupted by the flooded bridge, as was a diesel tram, isolating both trains at Richmond. Furthermore, the former train did not reach its destination due to landslides. The Jamaica Telephone Company reported troubles due to waterlogged telephone lines. Schools and colleges in Kingston suspended classes and motorists in the area had difficulty traveling due to flooded roads. Correspondents from The Gleaner reported heavy rains, which inundated roads, washed away livestock and destroyed crops. On June 9, the Church Welfare Organization of the West Indies Junior Seventh Day Adventists set out food, money and blankets the victims.

July tropical depression

It continued to the northwest and may have struck Martinique on July 26.

Tropical Storm Anna 

On July 23, a tropical wave emerged into the Atlantic from the west coast of Africa. By 0600 UTC on July 25, the system developed into Tropical Depression Twelve. Initially, the depression strengthened slowly while moving west-northwestward. Eventually, it was upgraded to Tropical Storm Anna at 06:00 UTC on July 27. At 12:00 UTC on July 30, Anna began to weaken and moved in a more northwesterly direction. By 12:00 UTC on July 31, Anna degenerated into a surface-based trough while situated north of the Lesser Antilles, but continued to produce gale-force winds.

Anna reorganized into a tropical storm by 12:00 UTC on August 1, but weakened to a tropical depression as it re-curved northeastward on August 2, while situated offshore of the East Coast of the United States. By 18:00 UTC, however, Anna once again regained tropical-storm status, and underwent steady intensification on the following day. Anna subsequently weakened and merged with an extratropical low-pressure area on the same day, while centered near Sable Island. The remnants continued rapidly east-northeastward across the Atlantic until becoming unidentifiable on August 5.

Early August tropical depression 

A trough in the western Gulf of Mexico produced an area of thunderstorms. On August 7, a Hurricane Hunters flight observed a circulation, indicating that a tropical depression developed. The system moved southwestward, making landfall near Tuxpan in northeastern Mexico early on August 8. It quickly dissipated after moving ashore.

Hurricane Blanche 

The system curved west-northward on August 6 and eventually moved around the western periphery of the Bermuda high. Under the influence of a trough, Blanche headed rapidly north to north-northeastward while significantly intensifying, becoming a hurricane by 18:00 UTC on the same date, based on Navy reconnaissance reports.

Afterward, the strong southwesterly current in which Blanche was embedded caused the storm to accelerate northeastward. By 12:00 UTC Blanche lost its tropical characteristics near Sable Island, having developed an asymmetrical wind field. While passing to the south of Newfoundland, the extratropical remnants of Blanche turned eastward and east-southeastward, eventually to be absorbed by a frontal zone late on August 14.

Hurricane Camille 

A tropical disturbance moved off the west coast of Africa on August 5, and developed into Tropical Storm Camille near Grand Cayman on August 14. The storm strengthened quickly into a strong Category 2 hurricane with winds of  when it struck near the western tip of Cuba on August 15. The storm damaged 100 homes on Isla de la Juventud, while 20,000 residents were left homeless on the mainland; five fatalities were also reported and damages reached $5 million. Early on August 16, Camille emerged into the Gulf of Mexico. After briefly weakening to Category 4 intensity near the Mississippi River Delta, Camille re-intensified prior to landfall near Waveland, Mississippi, early on August 18, becoming one of only four tropical cyclones to strike the mainland United States as a Category 5, the others being the 1935 Labor Day hurricane, Hurricane Andrew in 1992, and Hurricane Michael in 2018. Mississippi bore the brunt of Hurricane Camille. In Mississippi alone, 3,881 dwellings were destroyed and 41,848 were damaged. About 406 trailers were destroyed and an additional 325 suffered major losses. An estimated 645 farm buildings were destroyed and another 2,002 received major damage. In addition, 569 small businesses were impacted.

In Mississippi's neighboring states of Alabama and Louisiana, 1,781 homes were destroyed and 6,000 others were inflicted losses. About 676 trailers were demolished and 296 were severely impacted. Additionally, 124 small businesses were either destroyed or incurred major damage. Camille rapidly weakened after landfall on August 18 and was only a tropical depression about 24 hours later. However, the storm maintained intensity as it recurved to the east over the Ohio River Valley. It dropped heavy rainfall while approaching the Atlantic Ocean, especially in Virginia. Up to  fell in west central Nelson County. In Nelson County alone, 133 bridges washed out, while in some places entire communities were under water. Rivers crested at record heights, causing severe flooding. In the state of Virginia and West Virginia combined, an estimated 349 homes were destroyed and 2,587 received damage to some degree. Eighty-three trailers were demolished and 71 others received major losses. Reportedly, 730 farm buildings were destroyed and 535 were inflicted minor damage. Ninety-six small businesses were also severely damaged or destroyed. Along its path, rainfall was recorded in several other states, including Arkansas, Delaware, Florida, Georgia, Illinois, Indiana, Maryland, New Jersey, North Carolina, Ohio, Pennsylvania, South Carolina, and Tennessee. With losses estimated at $1.42 billion, Camille was considered the costliest hurricane in United States history at the time. Additionally, there were 256 deaths in the United States.

Hurricane Debbie 

On August 14, a tropical wave developed into a tropical depression while located about midway between the Lesser Antilles and the coast of Africa. The following day, the depression strengthened into Tropical Storm Debbie. Debbie then began oscillating between a Category 1 and a Category 2 hurricane for the next few days, possibly due to being seeded by silver iodide as part of Project Stormfury, though reanalysis suggested that an eyewall replacement cycle was the culprit instead.

Debbie curved northeastward as Hurricane Camille moved offshore the East Coast of the United States, weakening to a Category 2 hurricane early on August 21. Debbie accelerated and fell to below Category 2 intensity by 12:00 UTC on August 23. Six hours later Debbie became extratropical while still bearing hurricane-force winds, shortly before passing just offshore Newfoundland. The remnants of Debbie turned northeastward and deteriorated to gale strength late on August 24.

Tropical Storm Eve 

In the wake of Hurricane Camille, a quasi-stationary front moved across the Southern United States and became situated over North Florida. A cut-off low pressure area developed along the system and acquired a low-level circulation. Due to cold air in the region, the depression strengthened slowly while tracking nearly due east. Late on August 25, it was upgraded to Tropical Storm Eve.

On August 26, the National Hurricane Center noted although conditions would prevent rapid deepening, further intensification was possible. The storm threatened the Mid-Atlantic states and Bermuda, but remained offshore and caused no impacts in either region. Early on August 2, Eve was downgraded to a tropical depression. It began to succumb to the effects of cold air, which entrained the circulation of the storm.

Hurricane Francelia 

A tropical wave developed into a tropical depression near the Windward Islands on August 29. Initially, the depression slowly strengthened while moving west-northwestward and was upgraded to Tropical Storm Francelia until more than 24 hours later. While located north of Honduras, it curved west-southwestward and was upgraded to a hurricane on September 1. The storm quickly weakened inland, and less than 24 hours later, it dissipated over northern Guatemala. However, the remnants of Francelia later contributed to the development of Hurricane Glenda in the eastern Pacific Ocean.

During its early stages, Francelia brought gusty winds and light rainfall to several islands in the Caribbean Sea. While remaining nearly stationary offshore Central America, heavy precipitation fell in some countries, especially Guatemala where severe flooding killed 269 people and caused $15 million in damage. Throughout the country, approximately 10,200 people were left homeless. In neighboring Honduras, the hurricane caused damage in the northern portions of the country, with the offshore Bay Islands Department being particularly hard hit. There, the storm damaged or destroyed the majority of two towns. In El Salvador, flooding isolated towns for several days and caused crop damage. Coastal areas of Belize lost electricity and telephone service, and high winds resulted in extensive damage to banana crops. Francelia ranked as the deadliest tropical cyclone in Guatemala, until Hurricane Mitch in 1998. Overall damage was estimated at $35.6 million, and there were 271 deaths.

Hurricane Gerda 

A tropical wave located over the central Bahamas developed into a tropical depression on September 6. The depression moved northwestward and initially remained disorganized. By early on September 7, the depression made landfall near West Palm Beach, Florida. Impact in the state was minimal, limited mostly to light rainfall. Later on September 7, the depression reemerged into the Atlantic Ocean just south of Cape Canaveral. It began to strengthen on the following day and was upgraded to Tropical Storm Gerda at 0600 UTC. By late on September 8, Gerda intensified into a hurricane. Early on September 10, Gerda weakened slightly while approaching New England and Atlantic Canada.

It made landfall near Eastport, Maine, at 01:00 UTC on September 10, becoming the only hurricane on record to have impacted the state. Due to the winds and rainfall, portions of Maine, Massachusetts, and New Hampshire reported power outages and localized flooding. By 0600 UTC on September 10, Gerda became extratropical over southeastern Quebec. In Atlantic Canada, winds left many without electricity in New Brunswick and Nova Scotia, and left about $3.5 million in losses to apple crops.

Early September tropical depression 

A tropical depression exited the coast of Africa on September 5 and proceeded westward. At that time, the system had a tight circulation with organized convection over the center. On September 9, the system began weakening, dissipating a day later. The remnants eventually crossed the Lesser Antilles on September 13.

Hurricane Holly 

A tropical wave emerged into the Atlantic Ocean from the west coast of Africa on September 8. It quickly organized and was soon upgraded to Tropical Storm Holly.

On September 16, Holly weakened slightly while turning westward toward the Lesser Antilles. Due to the lack of good upper-level outflow, as well as unfavorable water, Holly quickly weakened to tropical storm status on September 18, as confirmed by the Hurricane Hunters. By the next day, it weakened to tropical depression status and later moved through the Lesser Antilles. Holly dissipated on September 21 in the Caribbean Sea, while situated between the Los Roques archipelago of Venezuela and Puerto Rico.

Mid-September tropical depression 

It is estimated that a tropical depression developed at 1200 UTC on that day. The depression headed north-northwestward and did not strengthen significantly, although it may have briefly become a tropical storm. By early on September 21, the depression made landfall between Panama City and Port St. Joe, Florida. It degenerated into a remnant low pressure area only a few hours later. A high-pressure ridge blocked the system's movement, moving it to the east. By September 23, the system became a low pressure trough. Upper-level wind shear moved the circulation to the east-northeast and moved into the Atlantic Ocean the next day.

Many bridges and roads were washed out or inundated by water, including portions of U.S. Route 98 and State Road 20 between Tallahassee and Panama City. In addition, a tornado spawned by the depression destroyed a trailer, damaged 30 homes, and toppled ballpark bleachers, fences, lights, and electrical poles. Damage in Florida reached almost $3.78 million, including $1.65 million to crops and $2.135 million to property. Severe local flooding ensued, causing damage to property and crops, mostly to peanuts that were not threshed.

Hurricane Inga 

A tropical disturbance developed into a tropical depression on September 20. However, by September 23, the storm weakened to a tropical depression. The depression continued west-northwestward, passing north of the Leeward Islands, before drifting northwestward. Inga became a tropical storm again on September 29. It continued to intensify, and achieved hurricane status on September 30, while curving northeastward. The storm then turned towards the south, and ultimately completed a cyclonic loop as it bent back westward. Late on October 3, Inga turned to the northwest.

Thereafter, Inga curved northeastward and continued deepen. While moving into an environment of colder sea surface temperatures, the storm began to weaken. As cold air became entrained into its circulation, the storm began to lose tropical characteristics. Inga briefly re-strengthened while beginning to drift generally eastward. However, storm turned southward and began to weaken, deteriorating to a tropical storm on October 10.

Hurricane Ten 

Six hours later, the system intensified into a subtropical storm as it headed east-northeastward.

Tropical Storm Eleven 

Tropical Storm Eleven developed from a subtropical depression southwest of the Azores on September 24. After a day of drifting west-southwest, it moved westward where it became a subtropical storm, and later a tropical storm on September 26. Satellite estimates suggest that it may have reached hurricane intensity but such could not be concluded by other data. It retained that intensity for two days, but on September 30, it became extratropical well east of Newfoundland.

Subtropical Storm One 

An upper-level low pressure area in the southeastern Gulf of Mexico spawned a subtropical depression at 1200 UTC on September 29. Operationally, it was classified as Tropical Depression Thirty-Two. Six hours later, the strengthened into a subtropical storm. It maintained that intensity for about 24 hours, before cool air and wind shear began weakening the storm early on October 1. Shortly thereafter, the storm weakened back to a subtropical depression, a few hours prior to landfall near Fort Walton Beach, Florida. The subtropical depression rapidly dissipated inland.

Several waterspouts were reported in the Panama City area, while a tornado touched down in Carabelle, and another unroofed a home in the St. James community. United States Coast Guard planes searched for three people in a light aircraft that went missing as it traveled from DeFuniak Springs to Sebring. The storm brought rainfall to several others states, reaching as far north as Maine.

Tropical Storm Jenny 

On October 1, a tropical depression developed over the northwestern Caribbean Sea from the same cut-off low pressure that spawned the previous subtropical storm on September 29. The depression moved quickly north-northeastward and struck Cuba early on October 2. While approaching the southwest coast of Florida later that day, the system intensified into Tropical Storm Jenny. Jenny emerged into the western Atlantic as a tropical depression, but increased ridging forced the storm to track west-southwestward back over Florida. The cyclone was unable to re-strengthen and dissipated on October 6 south of Louisiana.

The storm crossed Cuba as a tropical depression. Minimal impact was reported. The storm produced moderate to heavy rainfall over parts of the Florida Peninsula, peaking at  near Deland. Minor road washouts were reported in Lee County. Rainfall along the lower Kissimmee River and the Lake Okeechobee basin caused some pastures and flood plain areas to be inundated by water. Lake Kissimmee rose  in height due to precipitation. Jenny's remnants later contributed to the development of heavy rains in southern Louisiana.

Hurricane Kara 

The depression passed south of Turks and Caicos Islands and later to the west of Mayaguana. Early on October 9, the system turned northward and intensified into Tropical Storm Kara after several hours. Southwesterly flow associated with an upper-level trough then caused the storm to curve northeastward. On October 10, an upper-level low pressure formed offshore North Carolina. Initially, Kara moved rapidly north-northwest around the low. However, by October 11, Kara and the low merged, resulting in the former moving erratically. While tracking southwestward into warmer ocean temperatures, the storm continued to strengthen.

After executing a small cyclonic loop, Kara developed an eye feature on October 14, before strengthening into a hurricane on October 15. By October 15, an upper-level westerlies forced the storm to move northeastward and accelerate. Kara began losing tropical characteristics and weakening after encountering a cold trough over the northeast Atlantic, falling to tropical storm intensity late on October 18.

Hurricane Laurie 

Although conditions were favorable for rapid deepening, the depression failed to do so because it was not vertically stacked and struck the Yucatan Peninsula late on October 18. After emerging into the Gulf of Mexico on the following day, the system strengthened into Tropical Storm Laurie. Later on October 19, Laurie curved northward and continued intensifying. At 18:00 UTC on October 20, the storm became a hurricane. Thereafter, drier air began weakening Laurie on October 22. Laurie curved southeastward and then southward, allowing it to remain well offshore the Gulf Coast of the United States.

Early on October 23, the cyclone weakened to a tropical storm while curving west-southwestward. Late the following day, Laurie deteriorated into a tropical depression. After moving southwestward and then southward, the storm made landfall near Paraíso, Tabasco, Mexico, early on October 27. Laurie promptly dissipated. Offshore, oil rig personnel were evacuated as the storm approached. A hurricane watch was issued from Galveston, Texas, to Pensacola, Florida; the watch was extended eastward to Apalachicola, Florida, on October 21. Voluntary evacuations occurred in southern Louisiana out of fear of a storm similar to Hurricane Betsy in 1965 or Camille earlier that year. Impact on land was primarily limited to minor beach erosion. It caused minor damage in the Yucatan Peninsula and in Tabasco.

Tropical Storm Sixteen 

A subtropical depression formed west-southwest of the Azores on October 28. It moved northwestward, reaching tropical storm strength on October 29, and after turning sharply east, the system attained its peak of  winds. The storm transitioned into an extratropical on October 31 west of the Azores.

Hurricane Seventeen 

A large extratropical storm over the North Atlantic formed a subtropical storm on October 31 south of Newfoundland. It moved southeast, gaining tropical characteristics and strength on the way. It reached hurricane strength on November 4, peaking as a minimal Category 1 storm while approaching the Azores, but weakened prior to passing through the islands. The system transitioned into an extratropical cyclone on November 7.

Hurricane Martha 

Tropical Storm Martha developed in the southwestern Caribbean Sea on November 21. It remained stationary and quickly intensified into a hurricane. Subsequently, Martha weakened and drifted southward. On November 24, Martha made landfall in Veraguas, Panama, as a strong tropical storm. Martha was the only tropical cyclone on record to make landfall in Panama. The system weakened to a tropical depression and dissipated over land on November 25.

Because the storm weakened prior to landfall, strong winds were not expected or reported in the impacted countries. Agricultural land was flooded in Almirante, Bocas del Toro and streets became inundated in low-lying areas of Puerto Armuelles, Chiriquí. The storm also brought significant rains to Costa Rica. Flooding and mudslides isolated most of the capital city of San José. Numerous streets were inundated in Golfito. Damage in Costa Rica reached $30 million and 5 deaths were reported.

Storm names 
The following names were used for named storms that formed in the Atlantic basin in 1969. Storms were named Blanche, Camille, Eve, Francelia, Holly, Kara, Laurie and Martha for the first time in 1969. This is the same list used in the 1965 season, except for Blanche and Camille.

Retirement 

At some point after the season began, the name Carol (originally the C name on this year's list) was replaced with Camille. After the season, the name Camille was retired.

Season effects 
This is a table of the storms in 1969 and their landfall(s), if any. Deaths in parentheses are additional and indirect (an example of an indirect death would be a traffic accident), but are still storm-related. Damage and deaths include totals while the storm was extratropical or a wave or low.

|-
| Seven ||  || bgcolor=#| ||  ||  || Cuba, Jamaica, Florida ||  ||  ||
|-
| Anna ||  || bgcolor=#| ||  ||  ||  ||  ||  ||
|-
| Blanche ||  || bgcolor=#| ||  ||  || Sable Island ||  ||  ||
|-
| Camille ||  || bgcolor=#| ||  ||  || Southern and Eastern United States ||  ||  ||
|-
| Debbie ||  || bgcolor=#| ||  ||  || Newfoundland ||  ||  ||
|-
| Eve ||  || bgcolor=#| ||  ||  ||  ||  ||  ||
|-
| Francelia ||  || bgcolor=#| ||  ||  || Leeward Islands, Honduras, Guatemala, Belize ||  ||  ||
|-
| Gerda ||  || bgcolor=#| ||  ||  || East Coast of the United States, Nova Scotia, New Brunswick ||  ||  ||
|-
| Holly ||  || bgcolor=#| ||  ||  || Leeward Islands ||  ||  ||
|-
| Twenty-Nine ||  || bgcolor=#| ||  ||  || Cuba, Florida ||  ||  ||
|-
| Inga ||  || bgcolor=#| ||  ||  || Bermuda ||  ||  ||
|-
| Unnamed ||  || bgcolor=#| ||  ||  || None ||  ||  ||
|-
| Unnamed ||  || bgcolor=#| ||  ||  || None ||  ||  ||
|-
| One ||  || bgcolor=#| ||  ||  || Florida ||  ||  ||
|-
| Jenny ||  || bgcolor=#| ||  ||  || Cuba, Florida ||  ||  ||
|-
| Kara ||  || bgcolor=#| ||  ||  || North Carolina ||  ||  ||
|-
| Laurie ||  || bgcolor=#| ||  ||  || northern Mexico ||  ||  ||
|-
| Unnamed ||  || bgcolor=#| ||  ||  || None ||  ||  ||
|-
| Unnamed ||  || bgcolor=#| ||  ||  || None ||  ||  ||
|-
| Martha ||  || bgcolor=#| ||  ||  || Costa Rica, Panama ||  ||  ||
|-

See also 

 1969 Pacific hurricane season
 1969 Pacific typhoon season
 1969 North Indian Ocean cyclone season
 List of Atlantic hurricanes
 Atlantic hurricane season
 South-West Indian Ocean cyclone seasons: 1968–69, 1969–70
 Australian region cyclone seasons: 1968–69, 1969–70
 South Pacific cyclone seasons: 1968–69, 1969–70

Notes

References

External links 
 Monthly Weather Review
 HPC rainfall pages for 1969 tropical cyclones

 
Articles which contain graphical timelines